"How Do You Spell Matrimony?" is a 1965 Australian television play by Colin Free. It appeared on a double bill as part of Wednesday Theatre with The Face at the Club House Door.

It was based on a radio play which had been performed in 1962.

The play was later adapted for radio as "A Walk Among the Wheeneys".

Free also developed it into a TV series Nice'n'Juicy (1966–67) starring John Ewart.

Plot
Two brothers, one of whom decides to find a wife by correspondence. The lady turns up, but isn't quite what the two inexperienced brothers expect.

Cast
Peter Aanensen
Paul Karo
George Whaley
Norman Yemm

Duet on a Wednesday
It appeared as part of "Duet on Wednesday" is a 1965 Australian TV presentation on ABC TV of two new Australian plays by Colin Free, "How Do You Spell Matrimony?" and "Face at the Clubhouse Door". The whole show ran for 60 minutes and aired 14 July 1965.

"The Face at the Club House Door" was billed as "a satirical comedy".

Both were produced by Oscar Whitbread.

Nice 'n' Juicy
"How Do You Spell Matrimony" led to a TV series Nice n Juicy which ran for 13 episodes.

Premise
In the New South Wales town of Wyvern Creek, two brothers run a citrus orchard, Jack and Mort Hamlin. The elder brother, Jack, is conservative and wishes to develop the old family property. Mort wants to sell up and move to Sydney. However the property is subject to a double mortgage.

Cast
John Ewart
Carmen Duncan
Willie Fennell
Gwen Plumb
Stuart Finch

Background
The series was commissioned by Drew Goddard of the ABC. They intended to make another regular series, Marcellus Jones, based on script by Pat Flower but that appears to have not been filmed.

Episodes
1."A Couple of Sorts"

References

External links
 
 How Do You Spell Matrimony? at Austlit
 Complete script of Face at the Clubhouse Door at National Archive of Australia

1965 television plays
1965 Australian television episodes
1960s Australian television plays
Wednesday Theatre (season 1) episodes